Six United States presidents have made presidential visits to Sub-Saharan Africa. The first was an offshoot of Franklin D. Roosevelt's secretive World War II trip to French Morocco for the Casablanca Conference. More recently, Barack Obama, the first U.S. president with African American ancestry, visited his father's native Kenya in 2015. Of the 46 African nations identified as sub-Saharan by the United Nations, 14 have been visited by an American president.

Table of visits

See also
 Foreign policy of the United States
 Foreign relations of the United States

References

Benin–United States relations
Botswana–United States relations
Ethiopia–United States relations
Ghana–United States relations
Kenya–United States relations
Liberia–United States relations
Nigeria–United States relations
Rwanda–United States relations
Senegal–United States relations
Somalia–United States relations
South Africa–United States relations
Tanzania–United States relations
Uganda–United States relations
The Gambia–United States relations
Lists of United States presidential visits